Doupovské Hradiště is a municipality in Karlovy Vary District in the Karlovy Vary Region of the Czech Republic. It has about 200 inhabitants.

Administrative parts
The municipality is made up of villages of Činov, Dolní Lomnice, Lučiny and Svatobor.

History
The municipality was created on 1 January 2016 by diminishing of Military Area Hradiště.

References

Villages in Karlovy Vary